Anjirdan (also Romanized as Anjīrdān) is a village in Deh Tall Rural District, in the Central District of Bastak County, Hormozgan Province, Iran. At the 2006 census, its population was 455, in 86 families.

References 

Populated places in Bastak County